SOGo (formerly named Scalable OpenGroupware.org) is an open source collaborative software (groupware) server with a focus on simplicity and scalability.

SOGo provides collaboration for Mozilla Thunderbird/Lightning, Microsoft Outlook, Apple iCal/iPhone and BlackBerry client users. Its features include the ability to share calendars, address books and e-mail using an open source, cross-platform environment. The Funambol middleware and the Funambol SOGo Connector allow SyncML clients to synchronize contacts, events and tasks.

SOGo supports standard groupware capabilities including CalDAV, CalDAV auto-scheduling, CardDAV, WebDAV Sync, WebDAV ACLs, and iCalendar.

Microsoft Outlook support is provided through an OpenChange storage provider to remove the MAPI dependency for sharing address books, calendars and e-mails. Native connectivity to Microsoft Outlook allows SOGo to emulate a Microsoft Exchange server to Outlook clients.

Features

SOGo uses existing services including Microsoft Active Directory, OpenLDAP, SQL, and IMAP. Usage of industry services contributes to scalability. It is accessible through its web interface, desktop clients or mobile devices.

The web interface uses an AJAX interface and is available in several languages. The look and feel of version 2 mimics Mozilla Thunderbird and provides browser drag and drop capabilities for contacts, events and mail messages. Single sign-on security capabilities are available by using CAS, WebAuth, or Kerberos. Version 3 is based on AngularJS and Angular Material and provides a fully responsive interface.

Supported desktop clients are Mozilla Thunderbird with the Lightning extension, Apple iCal, and Microsoft Outlook. The SOGo Connector and Integrator extensions for Thunderbird provide improved functionality.

Mobile devices are generally handled through the Microsoft Exchange ActiveSync (EAS) protocol. Devices such Apple's iPhone are handled natively by SOGo as iOS supports CalDAV and CardDAV. Other devices can access the Web interface which is responsive since release 3.0.0.

History
The Skyrix Web Groupware was a web based calendaring, contact and project management system developed by the SKYRIX Software AG in Magdeburg, Germany (~1998-2008). It was based upon the SOPE application server (an open source derivate of WebObjects developed by the same company). That system was later released as an OpenSource project under the name "OpenGroupware.org".
Even though the name was derived from the OpenOffice.org project, it had no actual ties to the OpenOffice project.

OpenGroupware.org was functionally rich but very limited in scalability (worked for hundreds of users). As part of a large customer project which had the requirement to serve around 60,000 users, "Scalable OGo" ("SOGo") was created in 2004. "SOGo" lacks a lot of the functionality of OpenGroupware.org, but kept key calendaring, address book and email features. All designed to be highly scalable, and most importantly: to conform to open standards like CalDAV and GroupDAV.

The SKYRIX company eventually refocused on other endeavours. Inverse Inc picked up and continues to maintain and enhance SOGo, while adding a set of functionalities. Inverse, based in Canada, packaged and released version 1.0 of SOGo in 2009. In 2022, Inverse made a deal with Alinto.

External links

References

Free groupware
Free software programmed in Objective-C